Vlad Iulian Chiricheș (born 14 November 1989) is a Romanian professional footballer who plays for  club Cremonese and captains the Romania national team. Primarily a centre-back, he can also be deployed as a right-back or a defensive midfielder.

Chiricheș spent the first part of his senior career with Internațional Curtea de Argeș, Pandurii Târgu Jiu and Steaua București. He helped the latter to a Liga I title and a Supercupa României, before transferring in 2013 to Tottenham Hotspur in a then-Romania record sale of €9.5 million. After two seasons in the Premier League, he signed for Napoli in Italy. In 2020, following an initial loan, Chiricheș was acquired by Sassuolo for a €11 million fee.

A full international for Romania since September 2011, Chiricheș has earned over 70 caps for the country and represented it at the UEFA Euro 2016.

Club career

Early career
Chiricheș began his youth career in his hometown as a midfielder at LPS Bacău, and even played as a striker a few years later when he moved to Ardealul Cluj. At the latter side, he was teammates with also future Romanian internationals Mihai Răduț and Alexandru Maxim. In 2007, Chiricheș moved to Portuguese team Benfica.

Upon his return to Romania after twelve months spent in Lisbon, Chiricheș joined lower league club Internațional Curtea de Argeș and helped them achieve promotion to the top flight in 2009. In 2010, shortly after Internațional was dissolved, he moved alongside many of his teammates to Pandurii Târgu Jiu. Chiricheș was close to sign for FC Steaua București instead, but their coach Victor Pițurcă did not agree with the transfer.

Steaua București
After one season in Târgu Jiu, Chiricheș eventually sealed a transfer to Steaua București for a reported sum of €700,000 and 25% interest to Pandurii in case of a future move. Steaua paid €500,000 for the remaining procents of the co-ownership in August 2013, making the total transfer sum to €1.2 million.

On 25 October 2012, he scored an overhead volley from near the penalty spot in a 2–0 win against Molde in the Europa League, which put Steaua in control of Group E. Chiricheș scored from long range against Ajax on 21 February 2013, canceling out a two-goal first-leg deficit as Steaua triumphed in the penalty shoot-out to set up a round of 16 meeting with 2012 Champions League winners Chelsea. He scored again away, an equalising goal to make it 1–1 with a fine close-range finish on the stroke of half-time in the 3–1 second leg loss against "the Blues" at Stamford Bridge after Steaua won the first leg 1–0.

Tottenham Hotspur
On 30 August 2013, Tottenham Hotspur paid €9.5 million for the signing of Chiricheș from Steaua, which at the moment made him the biggest sale of the Romanian championship. He recorded his competitive debut in a 4–0 League Cup victory over Aston Villa, on 24 September. His Premier League debut was also an away game against Villa, a 2–0 win on 20 October in which the fans voted him Man of the Match. On 4 December, Chiricheș scored his first goal for the team, an equaliser from outside the penalty box in a 2–1 victory over Fulham. 

Towards the end of the 2015 winter transfer window, Italian side Roma offered €500,000 to take Chiricheș on a six-month loan, which was deemed too low by Tottenham and subsequently rejected. On 9 May 2015, he was sent off for two bookings as his team lost 3–0 to Stoke City at the Britannia Stadium.

Napoli

On 30 July 2015, Serie A team Napoli signed Chiricheș on a four-year deal for a £4.5 million fee. He made his league debut for the club in a 1–2 home loss to Sassuolo. 

On 10 September 2018, it was announced that Chiricheș suffered damage to his anterior cruciate ligament which would sideline him for most of the season.

Sassuolo
On 2 September 2019, Chiricheș joined fellow-Serie A club Sassuolo on loan with an obligation to buy at the end of the season. Chiricheș eventually left Napoli in the summer of 2020 for a fee of €11 million.

Cremonese 
On 8 July 2022, Cremonese announced the signing of Chiricheș.

International career
Chiriches made his debut for the senior team in an UEFA Euro 2012 qualifying match against Luxembourg on 2 September 2011. On 14 August 2013, Chiricheș became the captain of Romania, in the friendly draw 1–1 over Slovakia. His competitive debut as captain was on 6 September, a 3–0 victory against Hungary, in a 2014 FIFA World Cup qualifying game.

He played his fiftieth match for the national team on 5 October 2017, against Kazakhstan, in a 3–1 home win, match in which he captained Romania.

Career statistics

Club

International

Honours
Steaua București
Liga I: 2012–13
Supercupa României: 2013

Tottenham Hotspur
League Cup runner-up: 2014–15

Individual
Gazeta Sporturilor Romanian Footballer of the Year: 2013; runner-up: 2012

Notes

References

External links

Sportspeople from Bacău
1989 births
Living people
Romanian footballers
Romanian expatriate footballers
Romania international footballers
Romania under-21 international footballers
Association football defenders
Liga I players
Liga II players
Premier League players
Serie A players
S.L. Benfica footballers
FC Internațional Curtea de Argeș players
CS Pandurii Târgu Jiu players
FC Steaua București players
Tottenham Hotspur F.C. players
S.S.C. Napoli players
U.S. Sassuolo Calcio players
U.S. Cremonese players
Romanian expatriate sportspeople in England
Expatriate footballers in England
Expatriate footballers in Italy
UEFA Euro 2016 players